Cortez is an unincorporated community in Jefferson County, in the U.S. state of Pennsylvania.

History
A post office was established at Cortez in 1895, and remained in operation until it was discontinued in 1904.

References

Unincorporated communities in Jefferson County, Pennsylvania
Unincorporated communities in Pennsylvania